is a Japanese actress and voice actress who has worked on several anime and video game productions.

Filmography

Anime
Aquarian Age - Sign for Revolution – Yoriko Sannou
Last Order -Final Fantasy VII- – Turk (shotgun)

Video Games
Final Fantasy X (2001) – Yuna
Kingdom Hearts (2002) – Selphie Tilmitt
Final Fantasy X-2 (2003) – Yuna
Kingdom Hearts II (2005) – Selphie Tilmitt, Yuna
Dissidia 012 Final Fantasy (2011) – Yuna
Final Fantasy Type-0 (2011) – Seven
Final Fantasy Explorers (2014) – Yuna
Final Fantasy Type-0 HD (2015) – Seven
World of Final Fantasy (2016) – Yuna
Dissidia Final Fantasy: Opera Omnia (2017–18) – Yuna, Selphie Tilmitt, Seven
Itadaki Street: Dragon Quest and Final Fantasy 30th Anniversary (2017) – Yuna
Dissidia Final Fantasy NT (2018) – Yuna

Motion Capture
Final Fantasy VIII (1999) – Rinoa Heartilly, Edea Kramer
Final Fantasy IX (2000) – Garnet Til Alexandros XVII
Final Fantasy X (2001) – Yuna
Final Fantasy X-2 (2003) – Yuna
Final Fantasy VII: Advent Children (2005) – Tifa Lockhart

References

External links 

1975 births
Living people
Voice actors from Kōchi Prefecture
Japanese video game actresses
Japanese voice actresses
21st-century Japanese actresses